"Elected" is a single by rock band Alice Cooper, released as the first Hot 100 hit on their sixth studio album Billion Dollar Babies (1972). The single reached number 26 during election week on the charts in the United States, number 4 on the charts in the United Kingdom and number 3 in Austria. The promotional music video was directed by Hart Perry.

The song is a reworked version of their debut single "Reflected" from their album of 1969, Pretties for You. According to Alice Cooper, Joey Ramone acknowledged the similarity between "Elected" and the Ramones' "I Wanna Be Sedated".

Chart positions

Track listing
"Elected" –  3:40 
"Luney Tune" – 3:36

Appearances on albums
Billion Dollar Babies
Alice Cooper's Greatest Hits
The Beast of Alice Cooper
The Life and Crimes of Alice Cooper
Mascara and Monsters: The Best of Alice Cooper
The Definitive Alice Cooper
The Essentials: Alice Cooper
School's Out and Other Hits

Personnel
Alice Cooper – vocals
Glen Buxton – lead guitar
Michael Bruce – rhythm guitar
Dennis Dunaway – bass
Neal Smith – drums

Cover versions

  In 1992, a cover version titled "(I Want To Be) Elected" by Rowan Atkinson (as Mr. Bean) and Smear Campaign was released in support of the British charity Comic Relief and featured a performance by Bruce Dickinson and members of the hard rock band Taste (later known as Skin). The record was released in the run up to the United Kingdom General Election of 1992 and reached No. 9 in the UK Singles Chart. The music video, in which Mr. Bean's doorstep canvassing and electoral stunts are intercut with the live video of Dickinson and the band, was directed by Paul Weiland.
 British hard rock band Def Leppard recorded a live version in 1987, which was used as a B-side for their songs "Heaven Is" and "Stand Up (Kick Love Into Motion)" from their 1992 album Adrenalize.
 Following the death of Paddy Ashdown on December 22, 2018, the music video was broadcast by ITV on December 24, 2018, and featured a title card paying tribute to Ashdown.

References

Alice Cooper songs
Songs written by Dennis Dunaway
1972 singles
Mr. Bean
Comic Relief singles
Bruce Dickinson songs
Songs written by Alice Cooper
Song recordings produced by Bob Ezrin
Warner Records singles
1992 singles
1972 songs